National Route 75 is a national highway in South Korea connects Gapyeong County to Hwacheon County. It was established on 25 August 2001.

Main stopovers
 Gyeonggi Province
 Gapyeong County
 Gangwon Province
 Hwacheon County

Major intersections

 (■): Motorway
IS: Intersection, IC: Interchange

Gyeonggi Province

Gangwon Province

References

75
Roads in Gyeonggi
Roads in Gangwon